Steven Nyman (born February 12, 1982) is a World Cup alpine ski racer on the U.S. Ski Team. Formerly a slalom skier, he is now a speed specialist, with a main focus on downhill.

Born in Provo, Utah, Nyman raced at Sundance as a junior until making a move to Park City in 1999. He was a discretionary pick for the 2002 World Junior Championships in Tarvisio, Italy, where he won the slalom and finished second in the combined. His slalom gold qualified him to compete in the World Cup Finals in Flachau, Austria, and finished a surprising 15th in his World Cup debut. He did not compete regularly on the World Cup until the 2006 season, during which he notched a pair of top-ten finishes and competed in his first Winter Olympics, finishing 19th in downhill, 29th in combined, and 43rd in super G.

Nyman made his first World Cup podium in December 2006, placing third in a downhill at the Birds of Prey course at Beaver Creek, Colorado. Fifteen days later, he won his first World Cup race, a downhill in Val Gardena, Italy.

As the fastest racer at the 2010–2011 NASTAR National Championships, Nyman was the NASTAR National Pacesetter and represented the National Standard or Par Time for the 2010–2011 season.

Nyman won his third World Cup downhill in December 2014, all at Val Gardena. He injured his right knee (ACL) in late January 2018 at Garmisch and missed the rest of the season, including the  he had finished third at the pre-Olympic downhill at Jeongseon two years earlier.

World Cup results

Season standings

Podiums 
 3 wins – (3 DH)
 11 podiums – (11 DH)

World Championships results

Olympic results

Sponsors 
Nyman's sponsors are Fischer (skis, boots, bindings) POC (helmets, goggles), Spyder, VISA, Powerbar, Ski Salt Lake and Swix. In 2006 Nyman sold his helmet sponsor over eBay. The winning bidder was Ski Salt Lake.

References

External links 
 
 Steven Nyman World Cup standings at the International Ski Federation
 
 
 U.S. Ski Team – Steven Nyman
 Fischer Skis – athletes – Steven Nyman
 

American male alpine skiers
Olympic alpine skiers of the United States
Alpine skiers at the 2006 Winter Olympics
Alpine skiers at the 2010 Winter Olympics
Sportspeople from Provo, Utah
American Latter Day Saints
1982 births
Living people
Alpine skiers at the 2014 Winter Olympics